The Comeback is the seventh studio album by American country music band Zac Brown Band. The album was released on October 15, 2021, by Home Grown Music and Warner Music Nashville.

Track listing

Personnel
Adapted from liner notes.

Zac Brown Band
Zac Brown – acoustic guitar (all tracks except 9), electric guitar (track 12), mellotron (track 15), programming (track 7), lead vocals (all tracks), whistle (track 5), party claps (track 5)
Coy Bowles – electric guitar (all tracks except 3 & 13), party claps (track 5)
Clay Cook – acoustic guitar (tracks 4, 9, 10), electric guitar (tracks 1, 2, 4, 5, 7–12, 14, 15), drums (track 10), Hammond organ (tracks 1–6, 8–11, 13, 14), pedal steel guitar (track 3), piano (tracks 7, 10, 15), synthesizer (track 10), background vocals (all tracks), party claps (track 5)
John Driskell Hopkins – electric guitar (all tracks except 3 & 13), background vocals (all tracks except 3), party claps (track 5)
Jimmy DeMartini – fiddle (all tracks except 6), background vocals (all tracks), party claps (track 5)
Daniel de los Reyes – percussion (all tracks), party claps (track 5)
Chris Fryar – drums (tracks 1–3, 5–10, 12, 14), party claps (track 5)
Matt Mangano – bass guitar (all tracks), background vocals (track 10), party claps (track 5)

Additional musicians
Kyshona Armstrong – background vocals (tracks 6, 8, 12)
Dr. Richard Bland – background vocals (tracks 4, 5), party claps (track 5)
Nickie Conley – background vocals (tracks 6, 8, 12)
Paul Franklin – pedal steel guitar (tracks 1, 3, 13)
Austin Hoke – cello (tracks 10, 13, 14)
Evan Hutchings – drums (tracks 3, 4, 11, 13, 15)
Marcus King – acoustic guitar (track 6), electric guitar (track 6), duet vocals (track 6 + Deluxe Edition track 5)
Dirk Lemmenes – background vocals (tracks 4, 5), party claps (track 5)
Maureen Murphy – background vocals (tracks 6, 8, 12)
Gregory Porter – duet vocals (track 14 + Deluxe Edition track 20)
Eric Roderick – background vocals (tracks 4, 5), party claps (track 5)
Ben Simonetti – Hammond organ (track 10), mellotron (track 14), percussion (track 13), programming (tracks 7, 10, 15), background vocals (tracks 4, 5), party claps (track 5)
Ilya Toshinsky – acoustic guitar (tracks 3, 13), banjo (track 13)
James Willis – background vocals (tracks 4, 5), party claps (track 5)
Cody Johnson – duet vocals (Deluxe Edition track 1)
Blake Shelton – duet vocals (Deluxe Edition track 2)
Ingrid Andress – duet vocals (Deluxe Edition track 3)
James Taylor – duet vocals (Deluxe Edition track 4)
Jamey Johnson – duet vocals (Deluxe Edition track 5)
Jimmy Buffett – duet vocals (Deluxe Edition track 6)

Charts

Weekly charts

Year-end charts

References

2021 albums
Zac Brown Band albums
Warner Records albums